Asterosmilia is a genus of cnidarians belonging to the family Caryophylliidae.

The species of this genus are found in Europe, Central Asia, Japan and Central America.

Species:

Asterosmilia abnormalis 
Asterosmilia aliquantula 
Asterosmilia compressa 
Asterosmilia decapali 
Asterosmilia duncani 
Asterosmilia exarata 
Asterosmilia machapooriensis 
Asterosmilia pourtalesi

References

Caryophylliidae
Scleractinia genera